Sunset Ridge School District 29 is an elementary school district in Northfield, Illinois. This district feeds into New Trier High School in Northfield and Winnetka, Illinois. Sunset Ridge School, a 4th-8th grade school, is a new school that was built and finished in 2018 and is the first LEED Platinum Public Elementary School in Illinois. It has an average graduating class of 60 to 80 students. Sunset Ridge has been consistently rated as one of the top public schools in the State of Illinois. The school mascot is the Eagle. The district's K-3rd grade school is Middlefork School. Its mascot is the Dolphin. The superintendent is Dr. Edward Stange, and the principal is Dr. Ivy Sukenik.

Schools
Middlefork School
Sunset Ridge School

External links
 Sunset Ridge School District 29

Northfield, Illinois
School districts in Cook County, Illinois